The Museum of Communism in Czech Republic, located at V Celnici 4 in Prague, Czech Republic, is a museum dedicated to presenting an account of the post–World War II Communist regime in Czechoslovakia in general and Prague in particular. The Museum of Communism offers an immersive look at life behind the Iron Curtain. Genuine artifacts, interviews, archive photographs, artworks, historical documents and large scale installations that bring an entire chapter of history to life.

History
The museum was founded by Glenn Spicker, an American businessman and former student of politics, who spent $28,000 on buying 1000 artifacts and commissioned documentary filmmaker Jan Kaplan to design the museum.  According to Kaplan, he created a three-act tragedy in displays of the ideals of communism, the reality of poor life under the regime, and the nightmare of a police state.  It includes rooms depicting a schoolroom, a shop with limited supplies and a secret police interrogation room.

The gallery is devoted to providing a timeline of the communist regime in Czechoslovakia, the main medium is the use of colors, the excessive use of white, black, and red provide the museum a perfect communist ambiance, written descriptions in Czech and English language supported by red, and black artwork is there to explain to the audience what it was to live under communism regime, communist law and order, education system, trade and business all has been provided in written and pictorial form.

Gallery

References

Museums in Prague
Anti-communism in the Czech Republic
History museums in the Czech Republic
2001 establishments in the Czech Republic
Prague
21st-century architecture in the Czech Republic